The Equestrian Statue of Albert I is a bronze equestrian statue erected in Brussels, Belgium, in memory of King Albert I, third King of the Belgians. It was created by the sculptor  in 1951.

The statue stands on the /, at the point where the Mont des Arts/Kunstberg joins the /, and a few tens of metres from the Royal Library of Belgium (KBR). This area is served by Brussels Central Station.

History
The accidental death of King Albert I in 1934 aroused great emotion in Belgium, and many cities planned to pay homage to him. In Brussels, the form that this tribute should take, monument or architectural or urban development, was subject to discussion. It was ultimately the classical and traditional option of sculpture that won out.

The first project by the sculptor Alfred Courtens in the form of a  model was submitted in 1943, then revised and finally approved in 1946. The Second World War and the lack of materials further delayed the monument's construction. Finally, in 1951, the sculpture, cast by the Compagnie des Bronzes de Bruxelles, was brought to the site in three parts to facilitate transport (the body of the horse, its head, and the effigy of the king) and placed on the base designed by Jules Ghobert, one of the architects of the Royal Library of Belgium (KBR).

Description
The imposing bronze equestrian statue is placed high on a pedestal made of blocks of blue stone, dominating the town centre. Albert I is represented there in a classical way as a soldier king wearing the military coat and holding a helmet in his hand. The style is reminiscent of that of the Equestrian Statue of Leopold II on the /, whose author, Thomas Vinçotte, was Courtens's teacher. The sculptor justified the choice to represent his model bareheaded by the fear that the shadow of the helmet would hide his face.

See also

 History of Brussels
 Belgium in "the long nineteenth century"

References

Notes

Buildings and structures in Brussels
Tourist attractions in Brussels
City of Brussels
Statues in Belgium
Statues of monarchs
Bronze sculptures in Belgium
Monuments and memorials in Belgium